Harry B. "Chip" Limehouse III (born August 8, 1962) is an American politician from the state of South Carolina. A member of the Republican Party, Limehouse is a former member of the South Carolina House of Representatives, representing District 110.

Political career
Limehouse was elected to represent the 110th district in the South Carolina House of Representatives in 1994, taking office in 1995.

Limehouse ran for the United States House of Representatives in the 2013 special election to represent South Carolina's 1st congressional district.

In October 2015, Limehouse announced that he would not be seeking re-election. His seat is to be highly contested with Russell Guerard, Mike Seekings, Eddie Phipps and Trey Harrell.

Sacha Baron Cohen interview
In 2018, Limehouse appeared on Sacha Baron Cohen's Who is America? being interviewed alongside rapper Bone Crusher. He stated he was paid to appear in the interview and did not take it seriously.

Personal
Limehouse attended the University of South Carolina. While there, he played on the polo team. He has honorary doctorates from the College of Charleston, the Medical University of South Carolina, and The Citadel.

His father, Harry Limehouse, Jr., was a campaign director for the Republican National Committee. He ran for the Republican nomination to the United States House of Representatives in the 1st congressional district special election in 1971.

Limehouse is a real estate broker, and owns Limehouse Properties, a family business.

References

External links

1962 births
Living people
Politicians from Charleston, South Carolina
Republican Party members of the South Carolina House of Representatives
University of South Carolina alumni
Businesspeople from Charleston, South Carolina
21st-century American politicians